The 1st constituency of Doubs (French: Première circonscription du Doubs) is one of five electoral districts in the department of the same name, each of which returns one deputy to the French National Assembly in elections using the two-round system, with a run-off if no candidate receives more than 50% of the vote in the first round.

Description
The constituency is made up of the six former cantons of Audeux, Besançon-Nord-Ouest, Besançon-Ouest, Besançon-Planoise, Boussières, and Quingey.

At the time of the 1999 census (which was the basis for the most recent redrawing of constituency boundaries, carried out in 2010) the 1st constituency had a total population of 108,193.

Since 1988 the constituency has been a bellwether seat: that is to say, one where the voting has so closely matched the pattern exhibited in the overall result nationwide that opinion in the constituency can be viewed as an indicator for the political mood of France as a whole.

Historic representation

Election results

2022 

 
 
|-
| colspan="8" bgcolor="#E9E9E9"|
|-

2017

2012

Notes and references

Official results of French elections from 2002 taken from "Résultats électoraux officiels en France" (in French).

1